The Postponed Wedding Night is a 1953 West German comedy film directed by Karl Georg Külb and starring Margot Hielscher, Theo Lingen and Viktor Staal. It was based on a play by Franz Arnold and Ernst Bach. It was shot at the Carlton Studios in Munich. The film's sets were designed by the art directors Willi Schatz and Arne Flekstad.

Cast

References

Bibliography 
 Goble, Alan. The Complete Index to Literary Sources in Film. Walter de Gruyter, 1999.

External links 
 

1953 films
West German films
German comedy films
1953 comedy films
1950s German-language films
Films directed by Karl Georg Külb
German films based on plays
German black-and-white films
1950s German films